Eisenbach is a town in the district of Breisgau-Hochschwarzwald in Baden-Württemberg in Germany.

External links

References

Breisgau-Hochschwarzwald